Adirang Mahotsav is a theatre festival organised by India's National School of Drama. It is a tribal festival organised to showcase rural life of India. It is a festival dedicated to tribal art and culture in India.

References

Citations 

Theatre festivals in India